Mandy Moore is the second studio album by American singer Mandy Moore. It was released by Epic Records on June 19, 2001. Moore began taking more creative control of her music with the album, transitioning from the teen pop styles from her debut studio album, So Real (1999). The album includes elements of dance, R&B, pop rock, hip hop and Middle Eastern music.

Background
Over one year following the release of So Real (1999), Moore became very displeased with her early music, saying "All of the music has started to look and sound the same" and that she decided that it was time for her to move away from that. She expressed a desire to perform with more live instruments, saying in a Billboard interview that she wanted "no more dancers, no more singing to tracks. I got tired of that in a big way".

The album was a departure in sound for Moore. The opening track "In My Pocket" is a dance-pop song mixed with techno and R&B beats with a Middle Eastern sound. Moore co-wrote the final track on the album, "When I Talk to You". The song was written with Matthew Hager, who produced it. Moore said that the song was written while her and Hager were waiting to do a soundcheck. It was also the first song co-written by Moore that was included on one of her albums.

Critical reception

The album scored 56 out of 100 at review aggregator Metacritic, indicating "mixed or average reviews".

AllMusic gave the album a very positive review, saying, "Mandy Moore manages to pack more hooks, melody, beats, clever production flourishes, and fun into its 13 tracks than nearly all of its peers – remarkably, it's a stronger album, through and through, than either of Britney's first two albums or Christina's record..immaculately crafted, precisely polished, & exactly what a teen pop album should be."

Entertainment Weekly gave the album a mostly positive review and a B−, saying that Moore "tries out new sounds -- Eastern rhythms, jangly percussives -- that help separate her from the pack. Best of all, she spares us 'Look at Me!' vocal gyrations in favor of a breathy Natalie Imbruglia vibe. [...] [A]s teen pop goes, it could be a lot worse."

Rolling Stone also gave the album a positive review, saying, "It's so rare and refreshing when a teen star takes the high road...[Mandy's] CD offers the most startlingly liberated teen pop since Eighties mall-rat icon Tiffany euphemistically declared herself 'New Inside'."

Slant Magazine also gave the album a positive review, saying, "Mandy Moore is a refreshingly modest pop/rock excursion that gives Moore the opportunity to differentiate herself from the competition and further solidifies a promising musical future." It was given an honorable mention in the magazine's top music picks of 2001.

The album was chosen as one of Amazon.com's Best of 2001.

Commercial performance
The album debuted at number 35 on the US Billboard 200. The album was certified gold. Four singles reached the Top 40 Mainstream chart in the US, including "In My Pocket", "Crush", "Cry" and "17" was released in Asia, but none reached the Billboard Hot 100. The album had sold 462,000 copies in the U.S., according to Nielsen SoundScan. The Japanese edition of the album also had the bonus track "It's Gonna Be Love". This song was also on the soundtrack of Moore's romantic drama A Walk to Remember (2002).

The album also achieved moderate success worldwide, with Epic deciding that they would release the album where the first one did well. Mandy Moore performed well in Asia, being certified 4× Platinum in Philippines and 33rd Best Selling Album of all time in the Philippines with 200,000 copies sold. In New Zealand it became her second album to hit the top 40, peaking at No. 39. It reached No. 37 on the Australian ARIA Charts, her highest to date.

Promotion
Moore had her first headlined show, called "Mandy Moore Live @ ShoutBack", where she performed the songs:
 "In My Pocket"
 "One Sided Love"
 "Turn the Clock Around"
 "Cry"
 "I Wanna Be with You"
 "When I Talk to You"
 "Candy"

Moore also performed a number of songs live on TV shows, such as on TRL ("In My Pocket" and "Crush"), MTV Asia Sessions ("In My Pocket", "I Wanna Be with You" and "When I Talk to You"), The Rosie O'Donnell Show ("In My Pocket"), Miss Teen USA ("Crush"), Live with Regis and Kelly ("Cry"), The Tonight Show with Jay Leno ("Crush"), Channel V ("Crush"), and at the MTV Asia Awards ("Cry" as a duet with Regine Velasquez), among others. None of the songs from the record were performed at any of Moore's shows after promotion of the album ended.

Singles
The first single released from the album was "In My Pocket", on May 29, 2001. The song did not become a huge hit, but its unique sound allowed Moore to move away from the stereotypical image of other teen pop stars like Christina Aguilera, Jessica Simpson and Britney Spears, all of whom she had spent much of her early career being compared to. "In My Pocket" missed the Billboard Hot 100 but charted on the Bubbling Under Hot 100 Singles chart at number two (equivalent to number 102) on June 12, 2001. It performed modestly on CHR radio (the format in which Moore received most of her airplay), peaking at number twenty in Radio & Records. The song also peaked at number twenty-one on the Pop 100 chart, where it stayed for nine weeks, and also appeared on the seventh installment of U.S. version of the compilation series Now That's What I Call Music!, released in July 2001. In My Pocket performed fairly well outside of the United States in countries like Australia, where it reached number 11. The music video was directed by Matthew Rolston and was shot in a nightclub that was given a Middle Eastern look to match the similar feel of the song itself, including belly dancers and fire blowers. Moore sat on a throne and watched almost as if she were royalty. In other scenes, Moore is seen dancing and almost flirting with one of the dancers.

The second single, "Crush", also failed to make much impact on the U.S. charts, but it appeared on the eighth installment of the U.S. compilation series, Now That's What I Call Music!, released in November 2001. The music video was directed by Chris Applebaum and edited by Nabil Mechi. On September 10, 2001, it became Moore's first video to reach the number-one spot on MTV's countdown show Total Request Live. In the video, Moore sits in her crush's room and tries to wake him up. She performs with her band in another room. The video ends with Moore putting on a replica of the jacket Michael Jackson wears in his "Thriller" music video, walks out of her apartment and looks up at her crush and smiles.

The third and final single from the album, "Cry", was featured in the soundtrack for A Walk to Remember.

Track listing

Personnel
Credits for Mandy Moore adapted from AllMusic.

 Mandy Moore – primary artist, vocals (background)
 Gian Marco Zignago – composer
 Diane Warren – composer
 Nick Trevisick – composer
 Chris Theis – engineer
 Danny Simon – vocals (background)
 Darryl Jones – second tracking engineer
 Jon Secada – guest artist
 Jeff Rothschild – assistant engineer
 Ken Ross – producer
 Julie Rogers – string arrangements, violin
 David Rice – composer
 James Renald – composer
 Dave Reed – engineer
 Liza Quintana – composer
 Anne Preven – composer, vocals (background)
 Shelly Peiken – composer
 Peter Mokran – mixing, producer

 Tim Mitchell – composer, producer
 David McPherson – executive producer
 Timothy Loo – cello
 Rich Keller – mixing
 Steve Hallmark – engineer
 Matthew Hager – drum programming, guitar, keyboards, mixing, producer, string arrangements
 Ken Gioia – composer
 Matthew Gerrard – drums, keyboards
 Jenifer J. Freebairn – vocals
 Emilio Estefan, Jr. – composer
 Alexis Dufresne – engineer, producer
 Scott Cutler – composer, engineer, producer
 Todd Chapman – arranger, producer
 Randall Barlow – arranger, composer, producer, programming
 Brett Banduci – viola
 Tommy Anthony – vocals (background)

Charts

Weekly charts

Certifications

References

2001 albums
Mandy Moore albums
Epic Records albums